Benjamin Bullivant was appointed by Joseph Dudley as the first Attorney General of the Dominion of New England.

Bullivant was a founder, and the first churchwarden of King's Chapel,  Boston.

References

Massachusetts Attorneys General
17th-century American people
Year of birth missing
Year of death missing